is a Japanese talent agency headquartered in Shibuya, Tokyo. It was founded in 1993 and focuses on talent management for actors, comedians, musical artists and tarento alongside its subsidiary . The main K Dash agency consists of mainly actors and tarento while K Dash Stage emphasizes on managing comedians, variety tarento and theater production. The current CEO, Hideo Matsuda was formerly the manager of veteran comedian Masaaki Sakai.

Notable talents

K Dash 
Tsuyoshi Ihara
Katsunori Takahashi
Hatsunori Hasegawa
Yoko Minamino
Ken Watanabe

K Dash Stage 
Audrey (Masayasu Wakabayashi, Toshiaki Kasuga)
Tom Brown (Hiroki Nunokawa, Michio)
Hi-Hi (Kojiro Ueda, Kazunori Iwasaki)
Hanawa
Hamakan (Kenji Hamatani, Shinichiro Kanda)
Akimasa Haraguchi
Suzanne
Mika Hagi
Masafumi Akikawa
Fudanjuku

References

External links 

 K Dash Official website
 K Dash Stage Official website

Talent agencies based in Tokyo
Mass media companies established in 1993
Mass media companies based in Tokyo
Entertainment companies of Japan
Japanese companies established in 1993
Japanese talent agencies